Lafayette "Fat" Lever (born August 18, 1960) is an American former professional basketball player who played in the National Basketball Association. He later served as the director of player development for the Sacramento Kings of the NBA as well as a color analyst for Kings radio broadcasts.

Early life
Lever was born in Pine Bluff, Arkansas, to Elmer and Willie Lever. The second of three sons, he was nicknamed Fat by his younger brother, Elmer Jr., who had problems saying all the syllables in his name. Their father never lived with the family. In 1970, their mother, Willie, went west to work, while the brothers lived with their grandparents. The kids joined their mom in Tucson, Arizona, a year later.

Professional career

Portland Trail Blazers
Lever was selected by the Portland Trail Blazers with the 11th pick in the 1982 NBA draft out of Arizona State. While at ASU, his guard-tandem teammate was Byron Scott, who left school early (1983) to sign with the San Diego Clippers. In his NBA debut, Lever recorded 9 points, 7 assists and 4 steals in a road loss against the Kansas City Kings. On January 20, Lever recorded his first career double-double with 14 points and 13 assists in a road loss against the Mavericks. Three days later, Lever recorded his second career double-double when he had 11 points and 10 assists in a road win over the Spurs. On March 20, Lever scored a season-high 19 points to go along with 6 assists as the Trailblazers beat the Nuggets.

During his rookie season, Lever averaged 7.8 points per game, 2.8 rebounds per game, 5.3 assists per game, and 1.9 steals per game.

Denver Nuggets
Lever was considered one of the NBA's best point guards in the late 1980s while playing for the Denver Nuggets.

In his debut with the Nuggets, Lever recorded 14 points and 12 assists in a win over the Warriors. On November 6, Lever recorded a double-double of 24 points and 18 assists in a road win over the Lakers, the first time it happened in Nuggets history. On March 9 against the Pacers, Lever recorded his first career triple-double with 13 points, 15 assists and a career-high 10 steals. On April 10, Lever recorded a double-double of 26 points and 18 assists in a road loss against the LA Clippers. At that time, he joined Magic Johnson (in 1982-83) as the only players since the ABA-NBA merger to have at least 2 season games having recorded 24 points and 18 assists.

In his first season with the Nuggets, Lever averaged 12.8 points per game, 5.0 rebounds per game, 7.5 assists per game, and 2.5 steals per game. The next season, Lever continued his impressive performance for the Nuggets. On November 12, 1985, Lever recorded his first 30-point double-double as he recorded 31 points, 12 assists, and 9 rebounds in a road loss to the Rockets.

Despite his size (6 feet 3 inches), Lever regularly led the Nuggets in rebounding. He is the Nuggets' all-time franchise leader in steals and was 2nd in career assists. He is one of only three players in NBA history to record 15 plus points, rebounds, and assists in a single playoff game (the others being Wilt Chamberlain and Jason Kidd).

Dallas Mavericks
Lever was traded by the Nuggets to the Dallas Mavericks in 1990 for the Mavs' #9 pick in the 1990 NBA draft plus Dallas' first-round pick in the following one. The Nuggets subsequently traded the #9 pick and their own #15 pick to the Miami Heat for the Heat's #3 pick in the 1990 draft, with Denver sending the Mavs' 1991 first rounder (which was originally the Detroit Pistons' pick they acquired in the Mark Aguirre/Adrian Dantley trade) to the Washington Bullets along with Michael Adams, for the Bullets' first round pick in the 1991 Draft.

Lever sat out the entire 1992–93 season due to knee injury. He finished his career with the Mavericks in 1994 with career averages of 13.9 points, six rebounds, 6.2 assists and 2.22 steals per game.

Career accomplishments
Among Lever's career achievements were making two NBA All-Star teams, an All-NBA Second Team in 1987, and an All-Defensive Second Team in 1988.

As of the end of the 2020–21 regular season, he ranks 11th on the all-time list of most triple-doubles in the regular season with 43 over 11 seasons, ahead of players like Michael Jordan (28), Clyde Drexler (25) and Kareem Abdul-Jabbar (21).

He ended his career as the Nuggets second leading assists leader, behind teammate Alex English, third in terms of rebounds, behind Issel and English.

On December 2, 2017, the Nuggets retired Lever's number 12 jersey during their home game against the Los Angeles Lakers, which they won 115–100.

NBA career statistics

Regular season

|-
| style="text-align:left;"|
| style="text-align:left;"|Portland
| 81 || 45 || 24.9 || .431 || .333 || .730 || 2.8 || 5.3 || 1.9 || .2 || 7.8
|-
| style="text-align:left;"|
| style="text-align:left;"|Portland
| 81 || 22 || 24.8 || .447 || .200 || .743 || 2.7 || 4.6 || 1.7 || .4 || 9.7
|-
| style="text-align:left;"|
| style="text-align:left;"|Denver
| 82 || 82 || 31.2 || .430 || .250 || .770 || 5.0 || 7.5 || 2.5 || .4 || 12.8
|-
| style="text-align:left;"|
| style="text-align:left;"|Denver
| 78 || 77 || 33.5 || .441 || .316 || .725 || 5.4 || 7.5 || 2.3 || .2 || 13.8
|-
| style="text-align:left;"|
| style="text-align:left;"|Denver
| 82 || 82 || 37.2 || .469 || .239 || .782 || 8.9 || 8.0 || 2.5 || .4 || 18.9
|-
| style="text-align:left;"|
| style="text-align:left;"|Denver
| 82 || 82 || 37.3 || .473 || .211 || .785 || 8.1 || 7.8 || 2.7 || .3 || 18.9
|-
| style="text-align:left;"|
| style="text-align:left;"|Denver
| 71 || 71 || 38.7 || .457 || .348 || .785 || 9.3 || 7.9 || 2.7 || .3 || 19.8
|-
| style="text-align:left;"|
| style="text-align:left;"|Denver
| 79 || 79 || 35.8 || .443 || .414 || .804 || 9.3 || 6.5 || 2.1 || .2 || 18.3
|-
| style="text-align:left;"|
| style="text-align:left;"|Dallas
| 4 || 0 || 21.5 || .391 || .000 || .786 || 3.8 || 3.0 || 1.5 || .8 || 7.3
|-
| style="text-align:left;"|
| style="text-align:left;"|Dallas
| 31 || 5 || 28.5 || .387 || .327 || .750 || 5.2 || 3.5 || 1.5 || .4 || 11.2
|-
| style="text-align:left;"|
| style="text-align:left;"|Dallas
| 81 || 54 || 24.0 || .408 || .351 || .765 || 3.5 || 2.6 || 2.0 || .2 || 6.9
|- class="sortbottom"
| style="text-align:center;" colspan="2"|Career
| 752 || 599 || 31.7 || .447 || .310 || .771 || 6.0 || 6.2 || 2.2 || .3 || 13.9
|- class="sortbottom"
| style="text-align:center;" colspan="2"|All-Star
| 2 || 1 || 26.5 || .519 || .000 || .875 || 3.5 || 2.5 || 1.0 || .0 || 16.5

Playoffs

|-
| style="text-align:left;"|1983
| style="text-align:left;"|Portland
| 7 || 0 || 19.1 || .452 || .000 || .800 || 2.0 || 4.4 || 1.0 || .0 || 6.0
|-
| style="text-align:left;"|1984
| style="text-align:left;"|Portland
| 5 || 0 || 15.0 || .267 || .667 || .800 || 3.0 || 1.8 || .8 || .0 || 10.0
|-
| style="text-align:left;"|1985
| style="text-align:left;"|Denver
| 11 || 8 || 31.1 || .402 || .000 || .762 || 6.5 || 8.5 || 2.4 || .2 || 13.3
|-
| style="text-align:left;"|1986
| style="text-align:left;"|Denver
| 10 || 10 || 34.7 || .450 || .571 || .708 || 4.8 || 5.3 || 2.0 || .2 || 14.3
|-
| style="text-align:left;"|1987
| style="text-align:left;"|Denver
| 3 || 3 || 33.0 || .380 || .250 || .667 || 6.0 || 7.3 || 2.3 || .0 || 15.3
|-
| style="text-align:left;"|1988
| style="text-align:left;"|Denver
| 7 || 7 || 39.0 || .459 || .429 || .788 || 9.3 || 7.0 || 1.9 || .6 || 17.0
|-
| style="text-align:left;"|1989
| style="text-align:left;"|Denver
| 2 || 2 || 29.0 || .375 || .667 || 1.000 || 6.5 || 9.5 || 2.0 || .0 || 11.0
|-
| style="text-align:left;"|1990
| style="text-align:left;"|Denver
| 3 || 3 || 37.7 || .373 || .143 || .929 || 10.7 || 7.0 || 2.7 || .3 || 17.3
|- class="sortbottom"
| style="text-align:center;" colspan="2"|Career
| 48 || 33 || 30.0 || .414 || .409 || .775 || 5.8 || 6.2 || 1.9 || .2 || 12.4

See also

 List of National Basketball Association career steals leaders
 List of National Basketball Association players with most assists in a game
 List of National Basketball Association single-game steals leaders

References

External links

1960 births
Living people
20th-century African-American sportspeople
21st-century African-American people
African-American basketball players
American men's basketball players
Arizona State Sun Devils men's basketball players
Basketball players from Arkansas
Dallas Mavericks players
Denver Nuggets players
National Basketball Association All-Stars
National Basketball Association players with retired numbers
Point guards
Portland Trail Blazers draft picks
Portland Trail Blazers players
Shooting guards
Sportspeople from Pine Bluff, Arkansas